Peter Sands (1 May 1924 – 17 October 2015) was an Irish Fianna Fáil politician who briefly served as a member of the 22nd Seanad Éireann. He was nominated by the Taoiseach Bertie Ahern, on 23 June 2007, to fill a vacancy left by the election of Brendan Kenneally to the Dáil at the 2007 general election. He was not nominated to the 23rd Seanad.

Sands was a lifelong trade unionist and former president of the Local Government and Public Services Union. He was a director of elections for Fianna Fáil in County Louth.

Sands died on 17 October 2015.

References

1924 births
2015 deaths
Fianna Fáil senators
Irish trade unionists
Members of the 22nd Seanad
Politicians from County Louth
Nominated members of Seanad Éireann